Underhill is a large and imposing detached house, located at 99 Kells Lane in the Low Fell district of Gateshead, north-east England, United Kingdom.  Built primarily from sandstone in Victorian architectural style, it was the home of Sir Joseph Wilson Swan from 1869–1883, and is the first domestic property in the world to be illuminated by electric light bulb.

Previously used as a school, it is currently used as retirement sheltered housing.

References

Buildings and structures in Gateshead
Grade II* listed buildings in Tyne and Wear